Nicoline Haugård Sørensen (born 15 August 1997) is a Danish football player who plays as a forward for Everton in the English FA Women's Super League and the Danish national team. Having made her debut for the senior national team at the age of 19, she was awarded the Danish Football Association's prize for Talent of the Year 2016.

Club career
In August 2013, Sørensen joined Swedish club FC Rosengård. She was awarded a professional contract ahead of the 2014 season and went on to make ten Damallsvenskan appearances in the club's title-winning campaign. In February 2015, Sørensen returned to Denmark to play for Brøndby IF for more playing time and to catch up with her studies. In July 2017, it was announced that Sørensen would be making her return to Damallsvenskan to play for the reigning champions, Linköpings FC.

In July 2020, she left Brøndby to move to England, signing a two-year contract with Everton F.C. in the Women's Super League.

International career

After showing impressive form with Brøndby, Sørensen was called up to be part of the senior Danish national team for the 2016 Yongchuan International Tournament of China in October 2016. She was a replacement for the injured Nadia Nadim. In 2017, she was named to the Danish UEFA Women's Euro 2017 squad.

Personal life 
She is currently enrolled as a remote student at the Technical University of Denmark, completing a degree in innovation engineering. She speaks four languages: Danish, Swedish, English, and Norwegian.

International goals

Honours

Club 

Brøndby IF
 Elitedivisionen:
 Winner: 2014–15, 2016–17

FC Rosengård
Winner
 Damallsvenskan: 2014

Linköpings FC
 Damallsvenskan
 Winner: 2017

References

External links
 Profile at Danish Football Association 
 
 

1997 births
Living people
Danish women's footballers
Denmark women's international footballers
Brøndby IF (women) players
Danish expatriate women's footballers
Danish expatriate sportspeople in Sweden
Expatriate women's footballers in Sweden
Danish expatriate sportspeople in England
Expatriate women's footballers in England
FC Rosengård players
Damallsvenskan players
People from Ballerup Municipality
Women's association football forwards
Sportspeople from the Capital Region of Denmark
UEFA Women's Euro 2017 players